Latin Extended Additional is a Unicode block.

The characters in this block are mostly precomposed combinations of Latin letters with one or more general diacritical marks. Ninety of the characters are used in the Vietnamese alphabet. There are also a few Medievalist characters.

Latin extended additional table

The following table shows the contents of the block:

Compact table

History
The following Unicode-related documents record the purpose and process of defining specific characters in the Latin Extended Additional block:

See also 
Vietnamese language and computers

References

Latin-script Unicode blocks
Unicode blocks